Penal Servitude Act is a stock short title which was used in the United Kingdom for legislation relating to penal servitude. The abolition of penal servitude has rendered this short title obsolete in that country.

List
The Penal Servitude Act 1853 (16 & 17 Vict. c.99) (repealed by the Criminal Justice Act 1948, s.83(3) & Sch.10, Pt.I)
The Penal Servitude Act 1857 (20 & 21 Vict. c.3) (short title: 1896) Legislation.gov.uk
The Penal Servitude Act 1864 (27 & 28 Vict. c.47)
The Penal Servitude Act 1891 (54 & 55 Vict. c.69) (short title: 1896) Legislation.gov.uk
The Penal Servitude Act 1926 (16 & 17 Geo 5 c 58) (repealed by the Criminal Justice Act 1948, s.83(3) & Sch.10, Pt.I)

The Penal Servitude Acts 1853 to 1891 is the collective title of the Penal Servitude Act 1853, the Penal Servitude Act 1857, the Penal Servitude Act 1864 and the Penal Servitude Act 1891.

See also
List of short titles

References

Lists of legislation by short title and collective title
United Kingdom Acts of Parliament 1853
United Kingdom Acts of Parliament 1857
United Kingdom Acts of Parliament 1864
United Kingdom Acts of Parliament 1891
Penal labour